Félix Miélli Venerando (24 December 1937 – 24 August 2012) was a Brazilian football player, more commonly known as Félix.
 
Félix was born in São Paulo.  He was goalkeeper for Associação Portuguesa de Desportos and Fluminense Football Club. He won 47 caps (8 non-official) with the Brazil national team, including the 1970 FIFA World Cup-winning squad.

Honours

Club
Portuguesa
 RIO Branco Cup: 1967, 1968

 Fluminense
 Campeonato Carioca: 1969, 1971, 1973, 1975, 1976
 Campeonato Brasileiro: 1970

International
Brazil
 FIFA World Cup: 1970

References

External links
 
 

1937 births
2012 deaths
Footballers from São Paulo
Brazilian footballers
1970 FIFA World Cup players
FIFA World Cup-winning players
Brazil international footballers
Association football goalkeepers
Brazilian football managers
Clube Atlético Juventus players
Associação Portuguesa de Desportos players
Nacional Atlético Clube (SP) players
Fluminense FC players
Avaí FC managers
Campeonato Brasileiro Série A players